Wheel Ghar Ghar Mein is a game show that airs on Zee TV, India. It premiered on 20 April 2009 and is a daily show.

Plot 
Two hosts travel to cities all over India - and knock on the doors of two neighbours (in the same colony or building) to enter into a typical Indian household. Both families will play as a team in this game show which is all about teamwork.

The families fights for the title "Family No. 1" of their colony. The wife/mother leads her family as captain in outdoor and question games. The winner is the family with best teamwork. The winner of each city will compete against other families from other cities. The final families fight in the Grand Finale in Mumbai where "India's Family No. 1" will be declared.

Hosts 
 Vipul Roy
 Shardul Pandit (for  the last 2 weeks)
 Manish Paul

External links 
 

Indian reality television series
2009 Indian television series debuts
Zee TV original programming
2010 Indian television series endings